Mian Tahir Pervaz is a Pakistani politician who was a Member of the Provincial Assembly of the Punjab, from May 2013 to May 2018.

Early life and education
He was born on 4 June 1979 in Faisalabad.

He received intermediate level education from Government College University.

Political career

He was elected to the Provincial Assembly of the Punjab as a candidate of Pakistan Muslim League (Nawaz) from Constituency PP-69 (Faisalabad-XIX) in 2013 Pakistani general election.

References

Living people
Punjab MPAs 2013–2018
1979 births
Pakistan Muslim League (N) politicians